The 2006 WPA World Nine-ball Championship was the seventeenth edition of the WPA World Nine-ball Championship and took place between 4 and 12 November 2006 at the Philippine International Convention Center in Pasay, Philippines. The event was to be held for the first time in the Philippines, on a two-year deal, including the 2007 WPA World Nine-ball Championship. The championships were hosted by the World Pool Billiard Association (WPA).

Ronato Alcano won the championship with a 17–11 win in the final against Ralf Souquet of Germany. Defending champion Wu Chia-ching was defeated in the quarter-final by Alcano.

Tournament format 
The event featured a preliminary round robin format to half the field to 64; where the event changed to a knockout format.

Prize money

Preliminary round 
The Preliminary round was played over three days between 4 and 7 November. There were 32 groups of 4, with the first two in each group progressing. Nine top 32 players were knocked out in this section

 Alex Pagulayan (4)
 Mika Immonen (11)
 Rodney Morris (12)
 Niels Feijen (18)
 Jose Parica (23)
 Alex Lely (25)
 Chang Pei-Wei (26)
 Christian Reimering (28)
 Kunihiko Takahashi (29)

Final round 
The qualifying 64 players would play a knockout structure over six days. The first two rounds were competed as "race to 10", the next three rounds as "race to 11", and the final, as a "race to 17".

Notes and references

Notes

References

External links
Live scoring at WPA-pool.com
 Empire Poker WPA World Pool Championship 2003  at azbilliards.com

2006
WPA World Nine-ball Championship
WPA World Nine-ball Championship
International sports competitions hosted by the Philippines